Booton is a village and civil parish in the Broadland district of Norfolk, England, just east of Reepham and seven miles west of Aylsham. According to the 2001 census, it had a population of 100, including Brandiston and increasing to 196 at the 2011 Census.

History
Booton is a name of Anglo-Saxon origin meaning 'Bota's' farmstead.

In the Domesday Book, Booton is recorded as having a population of 7 households. The town was owned by Tihel of Hellean.

Notable natives/residents
Stephen Fry- Actor, broadcaster, comedian, director and writer.

War Memorial
Booton's War Memorial takes the form of a marble plaque in St. Michael the Archangel Church. It holds the following names for the First World War:
 Corporal Robert J. Hall (1884-1915), 2nd Battalion, Royal Norfolk Regiment
 Private Stanley W. Davidson (1895-1915), 1st Battalion, Essex Regiment
 Private Wilfred Stackwood (d.1916), Royal Norfolk Regiment
 Private Albert S. Bacon (d.1916), 2nd Battalion, Royal Norfolk Regiment
 Private Sidney A. Davidson (d.1917), 3/4th Battalion, Queen's Own Royal West Kent Regiment
 Rifleman William Coe (d.1917), 9th Battalion, Queen Victoria's Rifles, London Regiment
 Rifleman Sidney Page (d.1917), 9th Battalion, Royal Norfolk Regiment
 William Douglas
 William Hall
 John Long
 William Roberts
 Herbert Wells

Landmarks
St Michael the Archangel's Church, Booton is a redundant Victorian church designed by its Rector, Whitwell Elwin.

Notes

External links
Booton postmill history

Villages in Norfolk
Broadland
Civil parishes in Norfolk